Helga Stroh (born 4 March 1938) is a German fencer. She represented the United Team of Germany at the 1960 Summer Olympics in the women's team foil event.

References

1938 births
Living people
German female fencers
Olympic fencers of the United Team of Germany
Fencers at the 1960 Summer Olympics
Sportspeople from Frankfurt
People from Hesse-Nassau